Harmoni Jalinan Nada & Cerita is a studio album by Rossa, released on 5 August 2010. The main single of this album is "Memeluk Bulan" and the second single is "Ku Menunggu".

Track list 
 Memeluk Bulan
 Jagad Khayalku
 Ku Menunggu
 Tegar
 Terlanjur Cinta (feat. Pasha Ungu)
 Takkan Berpaling Dari-Mu
 Malam Pertama
 Aku Bukan Untukmu
 Hati Yang Terpilih
 Atas Nama Cinta
 Hati Yang Kau Sakiti
 Pudar
 Ayat-Ayat Cinta
 Hey Ladies

References 

 https://seleb.tempo.co/read/news/2010/08/31/112275350/rossa-luncurkan-album-kompilasi-terbaik
 http://lipsus.kompas.com/jalanjalan/read/2010/08/30/23313154/Rossa.Alami.Cinta.Bertepuk.Sebelah.Tangan
 http://musik.kapanlagi.com/resensi/rossa-harmoni-jalinan-nada-dan-cinta-terbaik-dari-yang-terbaik.html

2010 albums
Rossa (singer) albums